The twenty-third season of the American reality television series The Voice premiered on March 6, 2023, on NBC. The season is presented by Carson Daly, who returns for his twenty-third season as host. The panel of coaches for the season consists of Blake Shelton, who returns for his twenty-third and final season as a coach; returning coach Kelly Clarkson, who returns for her ninth season after a one-season hiatus; and debuting coaches Chance the Rapper and Niall Horan.

Overview

Development 
On October 11, 2022, NBC announced that the show would be returning for a twenty-third season to be aired in spring 2023. Previously, it was announced that, beginning with the 2021–22 United States network television schedule, only one season would be produced per cyclical year, though it was reported that this was reversed upon the announcement of the season. Later, in 2023, it was announced that the season would air on March 6.

Coaches and host 

Out of the four coaches that appeared in the previous season, only Blake Shelton returned, which marks his twenty-third season as a coach. It was also announced that Shelton would be departing from the show at the end of the season after having been a coach since its inaugural season, though he has not ruled out a return as a guest mentor.

Kelly Clarkson returns to the coaching panel for her ninth season, following her absence in the previous season. The season introduces two debuting coaches for the first time since season 11; the new coaches are rapper and singer-songwriter Chance the Rapper, and singer-songwriter and former One Direction member Niall Horan. The three judges replaced John Legend, Gwen Stefani, and Camila Cabello, all of whom had exited the panel for this season.

Carson Daly returned for his twenty-third season as the host.

Mega mentor 
On February 22, 2023, it was announced that Reba McEntire will appear as the season's mega mentor for the Knockouts. McEntire previously appeared in the show as the battle advisor for Team Blake on the show's inaugural season and as an advisor for all teams during the Top 12 live shows on season eight.

Additions 
The season will introduce the "Playoff Pass" in the battles round. A replacement to the "save" from seasons 14 to 22, the "pass" will allow each coach to advance further both artists of a battle; while one will still advance to the knockouts, the recipient of the "pass" will bypass the knockouts and go directly to the playoffs. Also the play offs will be pre recorded for the third time last being in seasons six, and thirteen where only 2 out of 5 per team will advance to the Top 8.  The coaches will choose the eight semifinalists. There will be only two weeks of live shows.

Promotion
NBC released its first advert for the season on December 13, 2022. On March 2, 2023, the show, via its online platforms, released the coaches' cover of Frankie Valli's "Can't Take My Eyes Off You".

Teams

Blind auditions 
The show began with the blind auditions on March 6, 2023. In each audition, an artist sings their piece in front of the coaches whose chairs are facing the audience. If a coach is interested to work with the artist, they will press their button to face the artist. If a singular coach presses the button, the artist automatically becomes part of their team. If multiple coaches turn, they will compete for the artist, who will decide which team they will join. Each coach has one "block" to prevent another coach from getting an artist. At the end of the round, each coach will have a team of ten artists, creating a total of 40 artists advancing to the Battles.

Episode 1 (March 6)

Episode 2 (March 7)
At the end of the five auditions, Jimmy Fallon made a guest appearance singing “I Keep Forgettin’ (Every Time You’re Near)”.

Episode 3 (March 13)

Episode 4 (March 14)

Episode 5 (March 20)

Ratings

References

External links 

 

The Voice (American TV series)
2023 American television seasons